Andrea Mohr (born July 19, 1963, in Neustadt, West Germany)  is a German writer who writes in German and English. Previously, she was involved in some international drug smuggling and other criminal activities like organized crime. She organized numerous trades around the world. She served a sentence from 1999 to 2004, in the high-security prison for women in Australia, in the Dame Phyllis Frost Centre in Melbourne.

Life

Prior to the detention 
She attended primary school from 1969 to 1973 in Neustadt, Germany where she attended the Leibniz Gymnasium. she attended the English night school Inlingua in Mannheim, Germany from 1983 to 1984 as a foreign correspondent. This was followed by studies of economics in 1985–1986 at the Ludwig Maximilian University of Munich. From 1986 to 1989 she studied Japanese and American Studies at the Free University of Berlin.

In Tokyo, Bangkok, Los Angeles and Kyoto, she worked as a photo model and hostess, in Berlin in Cabarets as a striptease dancer. She lived in Berlin from 1986 to 1996, and then in Melbourne until her deportation in 2004. Now she is back in her hometown.

Time in prison
She pleaded guilty to being knowingly concerned in the importation of 5.5 kilograms of cocaine by her ex-husband Werner Roberts; other co-accused were the well-known Melbourne lawyer Andrew Fraser and Carl Urbanec, her longtime German friend.

Andrea Mohr was sentenced to a maximum of 8 years, with a minimum of 5 years, and after serving 5 years she was deported back to Germany. Andrea had been married to Werner Roberts since 1997 and divorced him 2001. Werner Roberts was sentenced to 10 to 13 years in prison, Carl Urbanec 6 to 9 years and Andrew Fraser 5 to 7 years in prison. Corrupt Melbourne police officers were involved in the case, and were later indicted or even convicted, but this was because of other offences.

Andrea Mohr spent her entire sentence in high-security prison, since she was a high-profile case involved in international crimes, deemed to be a high escape risk. During her prison time she completed a correspondence course at the Swinburne University of Technology, Melbourne, in the fields of journalism and creative writing.

After Prison 
Since 2004 the author of numerous books such as:
For the German publishing house Umschau Buchverlag she wrote the following culinary travel guides:
"Kulinarische Entdeckungsreise durch Niederösterreich"
"Eine Weinreise durch die Pfalz"
"Trends und Lifestyle in Berlin" .

Her autobiography “Pixie” is published since July 2009 by Hardie Grant Books, Australian publisher in English language. Howard Marks wrote a quote for the book cover. “Pixie” will be published in January 2011 in German language by the publishing house Egmont (VGS) .

She wrote 22 short stories, the collection with the title “Blood-red” (not yet published) Two of those short stories will be published in the forthcoming book "Tripping" by Howard Marks.

In 2010 she started to present her show-and multi-media readings under the title "This is not a striptease", telling about her life.
She is active for Amnesty International and fighting for better conditions within the prison system.

References
Official Website of Andrea Mohr (English and German)
Pixie: Inside A World Of Drugs, Sex and Violence (English)
Dark side of the force (English)
New drug squad corruption allegations (English)
Bild Am Sonntag Article July 2010 (German)

External links 
 Official Website (englisch und deutsch)
 Pixie:Inside A World Of Drugs, Sex And Violence (englisch)
 Dark side of the force (englisch)
 New drug squad corruption allegations (englisch)

Notes

1963 births
Living people
German non-fiction writers
People from Neustadt an der Weinstraße